Avoidant personality disorder (AvPD) is a Cluster C personality disorder characterized by excessive social anxiety and inhibition, fear of intimacy (despite an intense desire for it), severe feelings of inadequacy and inferiority, and an overreliance on avoidance of feared stimuli (e.g. self-imposed social isolation) as a maladaptive coping method. Those affected typically display a pattern of extreme sensitivity to negative evaluation and rejection, a belief that one is socially inept or personally unappealing to others, and avoidance of social interaction despite a strong desire for it. It appears to affect an approximately equal number of men and women.

People with AvPD often avoid social interaction for fear of being ridiculed, humiliated, rejected, or disliked. They typically avoid becoming involved with others unless they are certain they will not be rejected, and may also pre-emptively abandon relationships due to a real or imagined fear that they are at risk of being rejected by the other party.

Childhood emotional neglect (in particular, the rejection of a child by one or both parents) and peer group rejection are associated with an increased risk for its development; however, it is possible for AvPD to occur without any notable history of abuse or neglect.

Signs and symptoms
Avoidant individuals are preoccupied with their own shortcomings and form relationships with others only if they believe they will not be rejected.  They often view themselves with contempt, while showing a decreased ability to identify traits within themselves that are generally considered as positive within their societies. Loss and social rejection are so painful that these individuals will choose to be alone rather than risk trying to connect with others.

Some with this disorder fantasize about idealized, accepting and affectionate relationships because of their desire to belong. They often feel themselves unworthy of the relationships they desire, and shame themselves from ever attempting to begin them. If they do manage to form relationships, it is also common for them to pre-emptively abandon them out of fear of the relationship failing.

Individuals with the disorder tend to describe themselves as uneasy, anxious, lonely, unwanted and isolated from others. They often choose jobs of isolation in which they do not have to interact with others regularly. Avoidant individuals also avoid performing activities in public spaces for fear of embarrassing themselves in front of others.

Symptoms include:
 Extreme shyness or anxiety in social situations, though the person feels a strong desire for close relationships
 Heightened attachment-related anxiety, which may include a fear of abandonment
 Substance use disorders

Comorbidity
AvPD is reported to be especially prevalent in people with anxiety disorders, although estimates of comorbidity vary widely due to differences in (among others) diagnostic instruments. Research suggests that approximately 10–50% of people who have panic disorder with agoraphobia have avoidant personality disorder, as well as about 20–40% of people who have social anxiety disorder. In addition to this, AvPD is more prevalent in people who have comorbid social anxiety disorder and generalised anxiety disorder than in those who have only one of the aforementioned conditions.

Some studies report prevalence rates of up to 45% among people with generalized anxiety disorder and up to 56% of those with obsessive–compulsive disorder. Post-traumatic stress disorder is also commonly comorbid with avoidant personality disorder.

Avoidants are prone to self-loathing and, in certain cases, self-harm. Substance use disorders are also common in individuals with AvPD—particularly in regard to alcohol, benzodiazepines, and opioids—and may significantly affect a patient's prognosis.

Earlier theorists proposed a personality disorder with a combination of features from borderline personality disorder and avoidant personality disorder, called "avoidant-borderline mixed personality" (AvPD/BPD).

Causes
Causes of AvPD are not clearly defined, but appear to be influenced by a combination of social, genetic and psychological factors. The disorder may be related to temperamental factors that are inherited.

Specifically, various anxiety disorders in childhood and adolescence have been associated with a temperament characterized by behavioral inhibition, including features of being shy, fearful and withdrawn in new situations. These inherited characteristics may give an individual a genetic predisposition towards AvPD.

Childhood emotional neglect and peer group rejection are both associated with an increased risk for the development of AvPD. Some researchers believe a combination of high-sensory-processing sensitivity coupled with adverse childhood experiences may heighten the risk of an individual developing AvPD.

Subtypes

Millon 
Psychologist Theodore Millon notes that because most patients present a mixed picture of symptoms, their personality disorder tends to be a blend of a major personality disorder type with one or more secondary personality disorder types. He identified four adult subtypes of avoidant personality disorder.

Others 
In 1993, Lynn E. Alden and Martha J. Capreol proposed two other subtypes of avoidant personality disorder:

Diagnosis

ICD
The World Health Organization's ICD-10 lists avoidant personality disorder as anxious (avoidant) personality disorder.

It is characterized by the presence of at least four of the following:
 persistent and pervasive feelings of tension and apprehension;
 belief that one is socially inept, personally unappealing, or inferior to others;
 excessive preoccupation with being criticized or rejected in social situations;
 unwillingness to become involved with people unless certain of being liked;
 restrictions in lifestyle because of need to have physical security;
 avoidance of social or occupational activities that involve significant interpersonal contact because of fear of criticism, disapproval, or rejection.

Associated features may include hypersensitivity to rejection and criticism.

It is a requirement of ICD-10 that all personality disorder diagnoses also satisfy a set of general personality disorder criteria.

DSM
The Diagnostic and Statistical Manual of Mental Disorders (DSM) of the American Psychiatric Association also has an avoidant personality disorder diagnosis (301.82). It refers to a widespread pattern of inhibition around people, feeling inadequate and being very sensitive to negative evaluation. Symptoms begin by early adulthood and occur in a range of situations.

Four of the following seven specific symptoms should be present:
 Avoids occupational activities that involve significant interpersonal contact, because of fears of criticism, disapproval, or rejection
 is unwilling to get involved with people unless certain of being liked
 shows restraint within intimate relationships because of the fear of being shamed or ridiculed
 is preoccupied with being criticized or rejected in social situations
 is inhibited in new interpersonal situations because of feelings of inadequacy
 views self as socially inept, personally unappealing, or inferior to others
 is unusually reluctant to take personal risk or to engage in any new activities because they may prove embarrassing

Differential diagnosis
In contrast to social anxiety disorder, a diagnosis of avoidant personality disorder (AvPD) also requires that the general criteria for a personality disorder be met.

According to the DSM-5, avoidant personality disorder must be differentiated from similar personality disorders such as dependent, paranoid, schizoid, and schizotypal.  But these can also occur together; this is particularly likely for AvPD and dependent personality disorder. Thus, if criteria for more than one personality disorder are met, all can be diagnosed.

There is also an overlap between avoidant and schizoid personality traits (see Schizoid avoidant behavior) and AvPD may have a relationship to the schizophrenia spectrum.

Avoidant personality disorder must also be differentiated from the autism spectrum, specifically Asperger syndrome.

Treatment
Treatment of avoidant personality disorder can employ various techniques, such as social skills training, psychotherapy, cognitive therapy, and exposure treatment to gradually increase social contacts, group therapy for practicing social skills, and sometimes drug therapy.

A key issue in treatment is gaining and keeping the patient's trust since people with an avoidant personality disorder will often start to avoid treatment sessions if they distrust the therapist or fear rejection. The primary purpose of both individual therapy and social skills group training is for individuals with an avoidant personality disorder to begin challenging their exaggerated negative beliefs about themselves.

Significant improvement in the symptoms of personality disorders is possible, with the help of treatment and individual effort.

Prognosis 
Being a personality disorder, which is usually chronic and has long-lasting mental conditions, an avoidant personality disorder may not improve with time without treatment. Given that it is a poorly studied personality disorder and in light of prevalence rates, societal costs, and the current state of research, AvPD qualifies as a neglected disorder.

Controversy
There is debate as to whether avoidant personality disorder (AvPD) is distinct from social anxiety disorder. Both have similar diagnostic criteria and may share a similar causation, subjective experience, course, treatment and identical underlying personality features, such as shyness.

It is contended by some that they are merely different conceptualizations of the same disorder, where avoidant personality disorder may represent the more severe form. In particular, those with AvPD experience not only more severe social phobia symptoms, but are also more depressed and more functionally impaired than patients with generalized social phobia alone. But they show no differences in social skills or performance on an impromptu speech. Another difference is that social phobia is the fear of social circumstances whereas AvPD is better described as an aversion to intimacy in relationships.

Epidemiology
Data from the 2001–02 National Epidemiologic Survey on Alcohol and Related Conditions indicates a prevalence of 2.36% in the American general population. It appears to occur with equal frequency in males and females. In one study, it was seen in 14.7% of psychiatric outpatients.

History
The avoidant personality has been described in several sources as far back as the early 1900s, although it was not so named for some time. Swiss psychiatrist Eugen Bleuler described patients who exhibited signs of avoidant personality disorder in his 1911 work Dementia Praecox: Or the Group of Schizophrenias. Avoidant and schizoid patterns were frequently confused or referred to synonymously until Kretschmer (1921), in providing the first relatively complete description, developed a distinction.

See also

 Attachment theory
 Avoidance coping
 Counterphobic attitude
 Experiential avoidance
 Inferiority complex
 Sensory processing sensitivity

Social:
 Hermit
 Hikikomori
 Loner
 Recluse
 Solitude
 Taijin kyofusho

References

External links

Cluster C personality disorders